Tulcoides is a genus of longhorn beetles of the subfamily Lamiinae, containing the following species:

 Tulcoides pura Martins & Galileo, 1990
 Tulcoides tibialis Martins & Galileo, 2009

References

Onciderini